Retta (born 1970) is an American stand-up comedian and actress.

Retta may also refer to:

People

Given name
Retta Davidson (1921–1998), American animator
Retta T. Matthews (1856–1899), American painter and sculptor
Retta Scott (1916–1990),  American animator and illustrator
Retta Ward (1953–2016), American health advocate
Retta Young (born 1949), American singer

Surname
Joe Retta, front man and vocalist of British glam rock band The Sweet
Seifu Retta (born 1954), Ethiopian boxer

Other uses
Retta, Arkansas, a community in the United States
Retta Dixon Home, an institution for Aboriginal children in Darwin, Northern Territory, Australia
Retta language, spoken in parts of the Indonesian Archipelago
Retta Nagala, a village in Muzaffarnagar, Uttar Pradesh, India

See also
Rettah Chess, a variant of chess invented by V.R. Parton
Reta (disambiguation)